Iain McGilchrist (born 1953) is a psychiatrist, writer, and former Oxford literary scholar. McGilchrist came to prominence after the publication of his book The Master and His Emissary, subtitled The Divided Brain and the Making of the Western World.

McGilchrist read English at New College, Oxford, but having published Against Criticism in 1982, he later retrained in medicine and has been a neuroimaging researcher at Johns Hopkins University in Baltimore and a Consultant Psychiatrist at the Maudsley Hospital in south London. McGilchrist is a Fellow of the Royal College of Psychiatrists, and has three times been elected a Fellow of All Souls College, Oxford.

According to his web site in 2009, at the time The Master and His Emissary was published, McGilchrist worked privately as a consultant psychiatrist in London. He still lives on the Isle of Skye, off the coast of Scotland and continues to write, and to deliver many lectures and interviews.

In 2019 it was reported that McGilchrist had been working on a new book of neuroscience, epistemology and metaphysics, The Matter with Things, which was published on 9 November 2021 by Perspectiva Press, London.

Selected works
 (Hardcover)

 E-. Print .
 (Hardcover)
 (Kindle ebook)
 (Paperback)
 (Hardcover, 2 volumes)

References

External links
McGilchrist's official website
McGilchrist's profile at All Souls College, University of Oxford
Channel McGilchrist web site
The Divided Brain documentary web site

Living people
1953 births
British psychiatrists
Fellows of the Royal College of Psychiatrists
Fellows of All Souls College, Oxford
Philosophers of mind
Cultural historians
British science writers
Alumni of New College, Oxford